The  Ernest Oppenheimer Bridge, named for Ernest Oppenheimer, originally opened in 1951 and rebuilt in 1953,
 links the town of Oranjemund, Namibia, with the South African town of Alexander Bay, on the southern bank of the Orange River.

References

Bridges in Namibia
Bridges in South Africa
Bridges completed in 1953